"In the Dark" is a song by British rock band Bring Me the Horizon. Produced by the band's vocalist Oliver Sykes and keyboardist Jordan Fish, it is featured on the group's 2019 sixth studio album Amo. The track was released as the seventh and final single from the album on 21 October 2019.

Composition
"In the Dark" has been described by critics as pop rock, electronic rock, and electropop. It was written by the band's lead vocalist Oliver Sykes, guitarist Lee Malia, bassist Matthew Kean, drummer Matthew Nicholls and keyboardist Jordan Fish. It was produced by Sykes and Fish. Speaking about the song to Kerrang!, Fish stated what the song was about:

Promotion and release
On 18 October 2019, the band revealed a teaser on their social media accounts for a video that used music from  "In the Dark" with the caption "r u ready?" This caused fans to believe that the band was about to release a music video for the single, which was announced to be released on 21 October 2019.

Music video
The video for "In the Dark" was released on 21 October 2019 and was directed by frontman Oliver Sykes and Brian Cox.

The music video stars and revolves around American actor Forest Whitaker. Whitaker's daughter was a fan of the band and him and his daughter attended a gig together in 2017, the band met Whitaker and his daughter backstage after the concert. They kept in contact and wanted to do something together. It was revealed that Whitaker was initially pinned to play the protagonist in "Mantra" but had to pull out due to scheduling conflicts. Sykes revealed that Whitaker contacted him when they were about to shoot the video for "In the Dark" and everything then fell into place.

Speaking about the concept of the video and his thoughts around it, Sykes told NME:

Charts

Certifications

References

2019 singles
2019 songs
Bring Me the Horizon songs
Songs written by Oliver Sykes
RCA Records singles
Sony Music singles